Magnar Nikolai Isaksen (13 October 1910 – 8 June 1979) was a Norwegian football (soccer) player who competed in the 1936 Summer Olympics. At club level, Isaksen represented Kristiansund FK and Lyn.

Career
Magnar Isaksen was born in Kristiansund. He was capped 14 times for Norway and scored five goals.

Isaksen was selected in Norway's squad who competed in the 1936 Summer Olympics and won the bronze medal in the football tournament. He scored both Norway goals in the 2–0 win against Germany. Iskasen was injured in the semi-final against Italy and therefore did not play the bronze final. He won two consecutive Norwegian Cups with Lyn in 1945 and 1946.

He also took part in the 1938 FIFA World Cup.

Honours
Norway
Summer Olympics bronze medal: 1936

Lyn
Norwegian Cup: 1945, 1946

References

External links
National team profile (NFF)
databaseolympics profile

1910 births
1979 deaths
Sportspeople from Kristiansund
Norwegian footballers
Footballers at the 1936 Summer Olympics
Olympic footballers of Norway
Olympic bronze medalists for Norway
Norway international footballers
1938 FIFA World Cup players
Olympic medalists in football
Medalists at the 1936 Summer Olympics
Association football forwards